Heiltz may refer to three communes in the Marne department in north-eastern France:
 Heiltz-le-Hutier
 Heiltz-le-Maurupt
 Heiltz-l'Évêque